Štanga may refer to the following places in Slovenia:
 Mala Štanga, settlement in the Municipality of Šmartno pri Litiji in central Slovenia
 Velika Štanga, settlement in the Municipality of Šmartno pri Litiji in central Slovenia